Royce J. Johnson is an American actor, screenwriter, and filmmaker best known for his recurring role in the MCU as Sgt. / Detective Sergeant Brett Mahoney in the Netflix series Daredevil, Jessica Jones, and The Punisher.

Early life
Johnson was born Royce J. Johnson and graduated from Warren Easton High School in 1990 in New Orleans, Louisiana.

Filmography

Film

Television

References

External links

African-American male actors
Male actors from New Orleans
21st-century American male actors
Year of birth missing (living people)
Living people
21st-century African-American people